Cheryl Peasley (born 5 January 1951) is an Australian sprinter. She competed in the women's 4 × 400 metres relay at the 1972 Summer Olympics.

References

1951 births
Living people
Athletes (track and field) at the 1972 Summer Olympics
Australian female sprinters
Australian female middle-distance runners
Olympic athletes of Australia
Place of birth missing (living people)
Commonwealth Games medallists in athletics
Commonwealth Games bronze medallists for Australia
Athletes (track and field) at the 1970 British Commonwealth Games
Olympic female sprinters
21st-century Australian women
20th-century Australian women
Medallists at the 1970 British Commonwealth Games